David E. Durston (September 10, 1921 – May 6, 2010) was an American screenwriter and film director best known for directing the Charles Manson-inspired, horror movie I Drink Your Blood, released in 1971.

Career
Durston wrote and directed for the famous television series Playhouse 90 (1956-1960). He appeared in the DuMont Television Network series Chez Paree Revue in 1950.

In 1965, he directed The Love Statue, his first feature movie, which dealt with LSD use. His second feature was the 1971 exploitation horror movie I Drink Your Blood, about a cult of Manson Family-esque Satan-worshipping hippies who, after becoming infected with rabies, turn into zombies.

Durston followed this with the dramas Blue Sextet (1971) and Stigma (1972), then shifted his career to hardcore gay porn with Boy 'Napped! (1975) and Manhole (1978), the latter of which was not released due to one of its cast members being cast in Escape from Alcatraz, as the association between him and gay pornography would hurt both his career and the Clint Eastwood film he'd appeared in later.

In later years, Durston attempted to develop a modernized remake of I Drink Your Blood, but the project was cancelled after his death.

Mysterious deaths

In January 1985, a man named Edward Durston accompanied actress Carol Wayne on vacation at the Las Hadas Resort in Manzanillo, Colima, Mexico. After the pair argued, Wayne reportedly took a walk on the beach. Three days later, a local fisherman found the woman's body in the shallow bay. An autopsy performed in Mexico revealed no signs of alcohol or other drugs in her body. Her death was ruled "accidental".

A man named Edward Durston had also been present during the death of actress Diane Linkletter in 1969 when she jumped from her sixth-floor Hollywood apartment window. Her death was blamed on the drug LSD, but toxicology tests found no LSD in her body after she died. Durston reported that he visited the young actress after a phone call at 3:00am. Linkletter was distressed and unhappy. After making some cookies, they sat up talking. At about 9:00am Linkletter went out to the kitchen and didn't return. According to the report that Durston made to Los Angeles homicide Detective Lt. Norman Hamilton, by the time he went looking for her, he was too late to prevent the young woman from jumping out the window. “She went over to a window. I tried to grab her and she went out,” said Durston. Linkletter died from her injuries caused by the fall.

Death
Durston died on May 6, 2010 of complications from pneumonia.

Filmography
As film director:
 The Love Statue (1965)
 I Drink Your Blood (1971)
 Blue Sextet (1971)
 Stigma (1972)
 Boy 'Napped! (1975, as Spencer Logan)
 Manhole (1978)

As screenwriter:
 The Love Statue (1965)
 I Drink Your Blood (1971)
 Blue Sextet (1971)
 Stigma (1972)
 Boy 'Napped! (1975, as Spencer Logan)

References

External links

1921 births
2010 deaths
American male screenwriters
Screenwriters from Pennsylvania
Deaths from pneumonia in California
Film directors from Pennsylvania
People from West Hollywood, California
Film directors from California
Screenwriters from California